José Domingo Cervantes Padilla (born 7 June 1995) is a Mexican professional footballer who plays for Real Zamora.

External links

1995 births
Living people
Footballers from Michoacán
Mexican footballers
Cafetaleros de Chiapas footballers
Liga MX players

Association footballers not categorized by position
21st-century Mexican people